The Millennium Iconoclast Museum of Art (MIMA) is a contemporary art museum in the Molenbeek-Saint-Jean municipality of Brussels, Belgium. It is a privately owned non-profit museum which was founded in 2016.

History 
Opened on 15 April 2016, the museum is owned by developer Jean-Paul Pütz. The four-story building was originally built in 1916 and it was once the Belle-Vue Brewery brewery. The MIMA was privately financed by Pütz at a cost of €18 million. Seven art collectors have contributed art to the museum. The museum has an operating budget of €600,000 per year.

The two directors are Alice van den Abeele and Raphaël Cruyt. They started the business as a non-profit. They thought the museum was needed because there are no public contemporary art museums in Belgium. The museum has displayed works by Momo and the duo Faile, David Shrigley, and Barry McGee.

The museum is located in a western municipality of Brussels called Molenbeek, at 41, /. The area has been considered by some media outlets as a "dangerous place", a reputation the museum seeks to shed.

See also 
 List of museums in Brussels

References 

Museums established in 2016
Contemporary art galleries in Belgium
Museums in Brussels